Duília de Mello (born 27 November 1963) is a Brazilian astronomer.  She is currently full professor at the Catholic University of America and collaborates with NASA Goddard Space Flight Center. Her research is mainly on galaxies.

Early life and education
Born in Jundiaí, Sao Paulo and growing up in Rio de Janeiro, she became inspired by the moon despite not having a telescope as a child. In the 1960s she was fascinated with Star Trek and Lost in Space, and in her teenage years she focused on the discoveries from missions to Jupiter and Saturn by Pioneer 10 and Pioneer 11.

Her undergraduate degree is from Federal University of Rio de Janeiro (Portuguese: Universidade Federal do Rio de Janeiro) as a Bachelor of Science in Astronomy, achieved in 1986. She went on to earn two masters: MS in Radio Astronomy from National Institute for Space Research (Portuquese: Instituto Nacional de Pesquisas Espaciais) in 1988; MS in Physics and Astronomy from the University of Alabama in 1993. She went on to earn her Ph.D. in Astronomy from the University of Sao Paulo in 1995.

Academic career and research
After receiving her doctorate, she became a post-doctoral fellow at Cerro Tololo Interamerican Observatory in Chile and National Observatory in Rio de Janeiro from 1995-1997.

This was followed by another postdoc position at the Space Telescope Science Institute (STScI) from 1997 to 1999. After, she went to Gothenburg, Sweden to work as an assistant professor at Chalmers University of Technology.

Her significant discoveries have been the supernova 1997D, the largest spiral galaxy in the universe, and stellar nurseries outside colliding galaxies, known as "blue blobs." These "blue blobs" weigh tens of thousands of solar masses and had never been discovered in such a sparse location before de Mello's discovery.

She is currently part of the research faculty for Catholic University of America and works at the Goddard Space Flight Center investigating interacting galaxies, specifically whether colliding galaxies form stars more effectively than isolated galaxies. Another interest is understanding how stars are born outside galaxies, so figuring out how blue blobs are created.

Advocacy
Beyond her research, which has thus far resulted in over one hundred publications, she is the founder of Mulher das Estrelas, which is an organizations that popularizes science and encourages female students to follow careers in STEM. She also has written two motivational book for students to study science, Living with the Stars (in Portuguese) and The Adventures of Pedro, A Space Rock.

Recognition
In 2013, Barnard College recognized de Mello as one of their "Women Changing Brazil."

References

External links

"Citations of Duília F. Demello". Google Scholar. Retrieved January 5, 2021
Mulher das Estrelas
Personal website: Duilia de Mello
Book Living with the Stars (in Portuguese)
Book The Adventures of Pedro a Space Rock

Brazilian astronomers
20th-century astronomers
1963 births
Living people
Brazilian expatriate academics in the United States
Women astronomers
Academic staff of the Chalmers University of Technology
Academic staff of the Federal University of Rio de Janeiro
University of Alabama alumni
University of São Paulo alumni